Prometheus is an outdoor 1958 cast iron sculpture depicting the mythological figure Prometheus by Jan Zach, installed north of the Jordan Schnitzer Museum of Art on the University of Oregon campus in Eugene, Oregon, in the United States.

Description and history
The Smithsonian Institution describes the sculpture as "two abstract figures with intrabody appendages supported by tripod-like legs". It measures approximately  x  x  and is set on a concrete base that measures approximately  x  x . A plaque on the front of the base reads: . The sculpture's condition was deemed "treatment needed" by the Smithsonian's "Save Outdoor Sculpture!" program in July 1993.

See also
 1958 in art
 Greek mythology in western art and literature

References

1958 establishments in Oregon
1958 sculptures
Abstract sculptures in Oregon
Ancient Greece in art and culture
Iron sculptures in the United States
Outdoor sculptures in Eugene, Oregon
Prometheus
Sculptures of classical mythology
Statues in Eugene, Oregon
University of Oregon campus
Cast-iron sculptures